This is a list of diplomatic missions of Suriname, excluding honorary consulates.

Africa

 Accra (Embassy)

 Rabat (Embassy)
 Dakhla (Consulate-General)

America

 Brasília (Embassy)
 Belem (Consulate-General)

 Havana (Embassy)

 Georgetown (Embassy)

 Port of Spain (Embassy)

 Washington, D.C. (Embassy)
 Miami (Consulate-General)

 Caracas (Embassy)

Asia

 Beijing (Embassy)

 New Delhi (Embassy)

 Jakarta (Embassy)

Europe

 Brussels (Embassy)

 Paris (Embassy)
 Cayenne (Consulate-General)

 The Hague (Embassy)
 Amsterdam (Consulate-General)
 Willemstad, Curaçao (Consulate-General)

Multilateral organizations
 Brussels (Mission to the European Union)
 New York (Permanent Mission to the United Nations)
 Washington, D.C. (Permanent Mission to the OAS)

Planned embassies

 Jerusalem (Embassy)

Gallery

See also
 Foreign relations of Suriname
 List of diplomatic missions in Suriname
 Visa policy of Suriname

References

Ministry of Foreign Affairs of Suriname (in Dutch)
Embassy of Suriname in Washington DC, USA

Diplomatic missions
Diplomatic missions
Suriname